Thomas Lauder was a Scottish churchman.

Thomas Lauder may also refer to:

Thomas Dick Lauder (1784–1848), writer
Tommy Lauder (born 1918), ice hockey player